Luis Manuel Corchete Martínez (born 14 May 1984) is a Spanish athlete who specialises in racewalking.

Corchete is a native of Torrevieja. In February 2021 he beat his personal best from 2012 by 12 minutes at the Spanish Championships to achieve the Olympic minimum standard in the 50 km walk and will make his debut at the delayed 2020 Olympic Games in Tokyo, when he was 37 years old. He competed in Tokyo but did not finish the race.

Personal life
His wife is the former international gymnast Jennifer Colino.

References

External links
 Luis Manuel Corchete at the Royal Spanish Athletics Federation
 
 
 
 

1984 births
Living people
Spanish male racewalkers
People from Vega Baja del Segura
Sportspeople from the Province of Alicante
Athletes (track and field) at the 2020 Summer Olympics
Olympic athletes of Spain